was an artist, one of modern Japan's most important and prolific printmakers. He was a prominent designer of the shin-hanga ("new prints") movement, whose artists depicted traditional subjects with a style influenced by Western art. Like many earlier ukiyo-e prints, Hasui's works were commonly landscapes, but displayed atmospheric effects and natural lighting.

Hasui designed approximately 620 prints over a career that spanned nearly forty years. Towards the end of his life the government  recognized him as a Living National Treasure for his contribution to Japanese culture.

Life 

Born 1883, from youth Hasui dreamed of an art career. His paternal uncle was Kanagaki Robun (1829–94), a Japanese author and journalist, who produced the first manga magazine. Hasui went to the school of the painter Aoyagi Bokusen as a young man. He sketched from nature, copied the masters' woodblock prints, and studied brush painting with Araki Kanyu.  His parents had him take on the family rope and thread wholesaling business, but its bankruptcy when he was 26 led him to pursue art.

He approached Kiyokata Kaburagi to teach him, but Kaburagi instead encouraged him to study Western-style painting, which he did with Okada Saburōsuke for two years.  Two years later he again applied as a student to Kaburagi, who this time accepted him. Kiyokata bestowed the name Hasui upon him, which can be translated as "water gushing from a spring", and derives from his elementary school combined with an ideogram of his family name.

After seeing an exhibition of Shinsui Itō's Eight Views of Lake Biwa, Hasui approached Shinsui's publisher
Shōzaburō Watanabe, who had Hasui design three experimental prints that Watanabe published in August 1918.  The series Twelve Views of Tokyo, Eight Views of the Southeast, and the first Souvenirs of Travel of 16 prints followed in 1919, each issued two prints at a time.

Hasui's twelve-print A Collection of Scenes of Japan begun in 1922 went unfinished when the 1923 Great Kantō earthquake destroyed Watanabe's workshop, including the finished woodblocks for the yet-undistributed prints and Hasui's sketchbooks.  Hasui travelled the Hokuriku, San'in, and San'yō regions later in 1923 and upon his return in February 1924 developed his sketches into his third Souvenirs of Travel series.

Kawase studied ukiyo-e and Japanese style painting at the studio of Kiyokata Kaburagi. He mainly concentrated on making watercolors of actors, everyday life and landscapes, many of them published as illustrations in books and magazines in the last few years of the Meiji period and early Taishō period.

During the forty years of his artistic career, Hasui worked closely with Shōzaburō Watanabe, publisher and advocate of the shin-hanga movement. His works became widely known in the West through American connoisseur Robert O. Muller (1911–2003).

In 1956, he was named a Japanese Living National Treasure. The government Committee for the Preservation of Intangible Cultural Treasures had intended to honor traditional printmaking via awards to Hasui and Ito Shinsui in 1953.  Because the artists' work necessitated collaboration between designer, engraver, and printer, objections were raised over singling out individual participants for recognition.  Therefore, they commissioned the artists to make new prints, the production of which was carefully documented. Hasui's biographer, Narazaki Munishige, was one of those who recorded the process.

Hasui died on November 27, 1957.  He had created around 620 prints over the course of his career. In 1979 Narazaki published a biography and compiled the first catalogue raisonné. An exhibition of 180 of his prints was held in Tokyo in 1982.  The catalogue was entitled: "Kawase Hasui: The End of the Line For Ukiyo-e".

Style

Kawase worked almost exclusively on landscape and townscape prints based on sketches and watercolors he made in Tokyo and during travels around Japan. However, his prints are not merely meishō (famous places) prints that are typical of earlier ukiyo-e masters such as Hiroshige and Katsushika Hokusai (1760-1849). Kawase's prints feature locales that are tranquil and obscure in urbanizing Japan.

In 1920 Hasui designed his first falling snow print. His snow scenes are among the most original and best of his works. He later recalled "In my earlier works there are novel expressions in carving line and forms: the artisans used to complain." He said of the relationship between designer and printer:

Hasui considered himself a realist and employed his training in Western painting in his compositions.  Like Hiroshige he made travel and landscape prints, though his subjects were less known locations rendered with naturalistic light, shade, and texture, without the captions and titles that were standard in prints of Hiroshige's age.

Kawase left a large body of woodblock prints and watercolors: many of the watercolors are linked to the woodblock prints. He also produced oil paintings, traditional hanging scrolls and a few byōbu (folding screens).

Gallery

Important works

 Twelve Scenes of Tokyo (1919–1921)
 Selected Views of Japan (1922–1926)
 Souvenirs of Travel, Vol. I (1919–1920) Vol. II (1921)
 Snow at Zojo Temple (1953)
 Hall of the Golden Hue, Hiraizumi (1957; Kawase's final work)

About dating of the prints: Many of them are reprinted 1960 after Kawase's death. (In Japan, it is unusual to number the prints, e.g. "5th of 100".)

Works in museums 

Hasui Kawase's works are currently kept in several museums worldwide, including the British Museum, the Toledo Museum of Art, the Brooklyn Museum, the Indianapolis Museum of Art, the Museum of Fine Arts, Boston, the Metropolitan Museum of Art, the Portland Art Museum, the Los Angeles County Museum of Art, the University of Michigan Museum of Art, the Minneapolis Institute of Art, the Stanley Museum of Art, the Walters Art Museum, the Clark Art Institute, the Smart Museum of Art, the Nelson-Atkins Museum of Art, and the Virginia Museum of Fine Arts.

References

Works cited

Further reading

Brown, Kendall and Newland, Amy Reigle. Kawase Hasui: the Complete Woodblock Prints. Amsterdam: Hotei Publishing, 2003. 
Brown, Kendall. Water and Shadow: Kawase Hasui and Japanese Landscape Prints. Virginia Museum of Fine Arts, 2014. 
Muneshige, Narazaki. Kawase Hasui mokuhanga shu.  Tokyo: Mainichi shinbunsha, 1979.

External links

"Hasui Watercolors and Prints - Some Comparisons" Robin Devereux
Kawase Hasui, Prints & Biography The Lavenberg Collection of Japanese Prints
Ayumi Ohashi Reprinting Hasui's Lake Kawaguchi Video by David Bull (23 mins)
"Collecting Hasui: a Conversation with René and Carolyn Balcer" Virginia Museum of Fine Arts (16 mins)
Artelino
Kawase Hasui's works at Los Angeles County Museum of Art

Japanese printmakers
1883 births
1957 deaths
Living National Treasures of Japan
Shin hanga artists
20th-century printmakers
Landscape artists
19th-century Japanese people
20th-century Japanese people